This is a list of Spring 1981 PGA Tour Qualifying School graduates.

Source:

References 

1981 1
PGA Tour Qualifying School
PGA Tour Qualifying School